Teebah Airlines was a Sierra Leone registered charter airline based in Amman, Jordan, leasing its aircraft out to other airlines on demand. Its main base was Queen Alia International Airport.

History
The airline was established in 2004, with the first flight having been operated on behalf of Iraqi Airways, linking Baghdad with Basra. Teebah Airlines was shut down in 2008.

The airline was on the List of air carriers banned in the European Union.

References

Defunct airlines of Jordan
Defunct airlines of Sierra Leone
Airlines established in 2004
Airlines disestablished in 2008
Defunct charter airlines
2008 disestablishments in Jordan
Airlines banned in the European Union
Jordanian companies established in 2004